The Woody Woodpecker Show is a long-running 30-minute American television series mainly composed of the animated cartoon shorts of Woody Woodpecker and other Walter Lantz characters including Andy Panda, Chilly Willy, The Beary Family and Inspector Willoughby released by Walter Lantz Productions. The series was revived and reformatted several times, but remained popular for nearly four decades and allowed the studio to continue making theatrical cartoons until 1972 when it shut down. It also kept the Walter Lantz/Universal "cartunes" made during the Golden Age of American animation a part of the American consciousness. The Woody Woodpecker Show was named the 88th best animated series by IGN.

History
Movie theater owners in the 1950s were finding that they could release features with reissued cartoons, or no cartoons at all, and the audiences would still come. Because of the practice, the theatrical cartoon business was suffering and losing money. By 1956 there were only seven animation producers in the short-subjects field, and by the end of the decade that number would dwindle down to three. Walter Lantz and his distributor, Universal Pictures, knew that the only way to subsidize the rising costs of new shorts was to release their product to television. Norman Gluck from Universal's short-subjects department made a deal with the Leo Burnett Agency to release some older Lantz product on television. Burnett handled the Kellogg's cereal account, and Lantz soon met with the Kellogg's people to sign the contract. Lantz admitted that he was only working in the medium because he was "forced into TV" and "cartoons for theaters would soon be extinct."

The Woody Woodpecker Show debuted on ABC on the afternoon of October 3, 1957. The series was shown once a week, on Thursday afternoons, replacing the first half-hour of the shortened Mickey Mouse Club. Lantz integrated his existing cartoons with new live action footage, giving the show an updated look that satisfied both viewers and Lantz himself. The live action and animation segments created for the show, called 'A Moment with Walter Lantz', featured an informative look at how the animation process for his "cartunes" worked as well as how the writers came up with stories and characters. The live-action segments were directed by Jack Hannah, who was fresh from the Disney Studio where he had done similar live-action/animation sequences for the Disney show.

After the initial year on ABC, The Woody Woodpecker Show was syndicated until 1966. The "A Moment with Walter Lantz" segments were eventually replaced with "Woody's Newsreel" and "Around The World with Woody" which used footage of Universal Newsreels and featured voice-over commentary by Walter Lantz and Woody Woodpecker.

In 1970, the show reappeared on network television, with 26 additional episodes assembled by Lantz for NBC.  The show ran on NBC until September 2, 1972, which is the same year the Walter Lantz Productions studio shut down. The show was revived again on September 11, 1976, featuring cartoons made from 1940 to 1965. The show ended its network run on September 3, 1977. Local stations continued to air The Woody Woodpecker Show for the next several years.

In 1984, Lantz sold everything outright to MCA/Universal, though he remained active in overseeing how Universal handled his characters (for merchandise, TV, home video, theme parks, limited edition cels, etc.) up until his death in 1994.

In 1987, MCA/Universal and The Program Exchange returned the show to television with a new 90 episode package for syndication. This Woody Woodpecker Show featured a complete overhaul of the series format. Gone were the newsreels, "Around the World" segments, and live action scenes with Walter Lantz, replaced by vignettes known as "Musical Miniatures", in which new musical compositions were played over montages of classic cartoon footage. New commercial bumpers were added and a new opening sequence was created. This one featured Woody, Andy Panda, Chilly Willy, Smedley the Dog, and Inspector Willoughby along with Woody's nemeses Buzz Buzzard, Gabby Gator, and Wally Walrus as they caused chaos in a small town. Episodes of this Woody Woodpecker Show typically consisted of two Woody cartoons bookending another Lantz cartoon (typically a Chilly Willy cartoon). The series continued airing in syndication until 1998. Around that time, Cartoon Network picked up rerun rights and aired The Woody Woodpecker Show for several months, after which the series disappeared from television.

After Cartoon Network dropped The Woody Woodpecker Show, Universal revived most of the Lantz characters in The New Woody Woodpecker Show with Billy West voicing Woody, which ran from 1999 to 2002 as part of the Fox Kids Saturday morning lineup.

Episodes 
Cartoons with an '*' are repeats.

Series 1 (1957—1958)

Series 2 (1963—1964)

From Series 3 onward, the episode include four cartoons instead of three.

Series 3 (1970—1971)

Series 4 (1971—1972)

Series 5 (1976—1977)

Broadcast history 
Does not include reruns
 October 3, 1957 — September 25, 1958 (ABC) (original animation with bridge animation)*
 1964 — 1965 (Syndication) (original animation with bridge animation)*
 September 12, 1970 - September 2, 1972 (NBC) (new 26 episodes without bridge animation)
 1958 — 1966 (Syndication) (reruns)
 September 11, 1976 - September 3, 1977 (NBC) (reruns only)
 1987 — 1997 (Syndication) (reruns only)
 1997 — 1998 (Cartoon Network) (reruns only) 
 1998 — 2001 (Nickelodeon) (reruns only)  
 2011 — 2015 (Teletoon Retro) (reruns only)

(*) = total of 59 episodes with original animation

Home media
In the early 2000s, a series of mail-order Woody Woodpecker Show VHS tapes and DVDs were made available through Columbia House. Each volume featured "cartunes", bumpers, and 'A Moment with Walter Lantz' or Newsreel segments set in the 1957-1977 format of The Woody Woodpecker Show, though Volumes 11-15 hardly feature any "Moments" or "Newsreels". There were complaints about cuts made to the shorts, which ranged from shorts from restored and intact prints to severely cut TV edits.

In 2007, Universal Studios Home Entertainment released The Woody Woodpecker and Friends Classic Cartoon Collection, six behind-the-scenes segments from The Woody Woodpecker Show and a 1964 episode that contained the cartoon "Spook-a-Nanny" were released on the collection as bonus features. The following year, The Woody Woodpecker and Friends Classic Cartoon Collection: Volume 2 was released, featuring twelve behind-the-scenes segments and two pilot cartoons, "The Secret Weapon" and "Jungle Medics" from The Woody Woodpecker Show.

References

External links
Toontracker.com
Skooldays.com
The Walter Lantz Cartune Encyclopedia
List of episodes ABC season

 

1957 American television series debuts
1958 American television series endings
1950s American animated television series
1950s American anthology television series
American Broadcasting Company original programming
American children's animated anthology television series
American children's animated comedy television series
American television series with live action and animation
NBC original programming
Television series by Universal Television
English-language television shows
Animated television shows based on films
Animated television series about birds